Charlotte Allen may refer to:

 Charlotte Baldwin Allen (1803–1895), known in Texan history as the "mother of Houston"
 Charlotte Vale Allen (born 1941), writer